Eduardo Amer Peraza (born 30 November 1987 in Merida, Yucatan, Mexico) is a Mexican actor best known for his role of Bebote in the Telemundo drama series Señora Acero (2015–2018). Amer studied acting at the New York Film Academy and the Centro de Educación Artística of Televisa.

Personal life 
Amer was in a relationship with Venezuelan actress María José Magán since filming the series Señora Acero. In December 2021, he married his American fitness-model girlfriend, Courtney Nicole.

Filmography

References

External links 
 

1987 births
Living people
People educated at Centro de Estudios y Formación Actoral
21st-century Mexican male actors
Mexican male telenovela actors
Mexican male television actors
Mexican male actors
People from Yucatán
People from Mérida, Yucatán